Metzneria diamondi is a moth of the family Gelechiidae. It is found in Iraq.

References

Moths described in 1949
Metzneria